Ondřej Chvěja (born 17 July 1998) is a Czech footballer who plays for Pardubice on loan from Baník Ostrava.

References

External links
Ondřej Chvěja at FAČR

Living people
1998 births
People from Hlučín
Czech footballers
Czech expatriate footballers
Czech Republic youth international footballers
Association football midfielders
FC Baník Ostrava players
FK Frýdek-Místek players
MFK Vítkovice players
FK Pohronie players
Czech First League players
Czech National Football League players
Slovak Super Liga players
Expatriate footballers in Slovakia
Czech expatriate sportspeople in Slovakia
Sportspeople from the Moravian-Silesian Region
FK Pardubice players